WDEL may refer to:

 WDEL (AM), a radio station (1150 AM) licensed to serve Wilmington, Delaware, United States
 WDEL-FM, a radio station (101.7 FM) licensed to serve Canton, New Jersey, United States
 WVUE (Delaware), a defunct television station (channel 12) formerly licensed to serve Wilmington, Delaware, which held the call sign WDEL-TV from 1949 to 1955